The 2005 GFS Marketplace 400 was the 23rd stock car race of the 2005 NASCAR Nextel Cup Series season and the 36th iteration of the event. The race was held on Sunday, August 21, 2005, in Brooklyn, Michigan at Michigan International Speedway, a two-mile (3.2 km) permanent moderate-banked D-shaped speedway. The race took the scheduled 200 laps to complete. After a caution on lap 144, drivers would use many different fuel strategies to get to the end, including pitting and trying to stretch a fuel run, a gas and go, or two or four tires. Jeremy Mayfield of Evernham Motorsports would top off on fuel on Lap 149, and would take the lead on lap 195 after many leaders had to pit due to running out of fuel. Mayfield would conserve and coast to the line to win his fifth and final NASCAR Nextel Cup Series career win and his only win of the season. To fill out the podium, Scott Riggs of MBV Motorsports and Matt Kenseth of Roush Racing would finish second and third, respectively.

Background 

The race was held at Michigan International Speedway, a two-mile (3.2 km) moderate-banked D-shaped speedway located in Brooklyn, Michigan. The track is used primarily for NASCAR events. It is known as a "sister track" to Texas World Speedway as MIS's oval design was a direct basis of TWS, with moderate modifications to the banking in the corners, and was used as the basis of Auto Club Speedway. The track is owned by International Speedway Corporation. Michigan International Speedway is recognized as one of motorsports' premier facilities because of its wide racing surface and high banking (by open-wheel standards; the 18-degree banking is modest by stock car standards).

Entry list 

*Withdrew on Friday.

Practice

First practice 
The first practice session was held on Friday, August 19, at 1:20 PM EST and would last for one hour and 20 minutes.

Second and final practice 
The second and final practice session, sometimes referred to as Happy Hour, was held on Friday, August 19, at 4:00 PM EST and would last for one hour.

Qualifying 
Qualifying was held on Saturday, August 20, at 12:10 PM EST. Each driver would have two laps to set their fastest lap; whichever lap was fastest would be considered their official lap time.

Five drivers would fail to qualify: P. J. Jones, Carl Long, Eric McClure, Bryan Reffner, and Morgan Shepherd.

Full qualifying results

Race results

References 

2005 NASCAR Nextel Cup Series
NASCAR races at Michigan International Speedway
August 2005 sports events in the United States
2005 in sports in Michigan